Lectionary 130, designated by siglum ℓ 130 (in the Gregory-Aland numbering) is a Greek manuscript of the New Testament, on parchment leaves. Palaeographically it has been assigned to the 10th century.

Description 

The codex contains lessons from the Gospels of John, Matthew, Luke lectionary (Evangelistarium) with some lacunae at the end. It is written in Greek uncial letters, on two volumes, on 343 parchment leaves. The text is written in two columns per page, 20 lines per page, 9-13 letters per line. The uncial letters are large.

It contains the Pericope Adulterae (John 8:1-11 - not 8:3-11 as usual for lectionaries). 
It is very beautiful.

History 

In 1583 the manuscript belonged to Francesco Accioda in Messina. The manuscript was added to the list of New Testament manuscripts by Scholz. 
It was examined by Scholz, and Gregory. 

The manuscript is not cited in the critical editions of the Greek New Testament (UBS3).

Currently the codex is located in the Vatican Library (Ottob. gr. 2) in Rome.

See also 

 List of New Testament lectionaries
 Biblical manuscript
 Textual criticism

Notes and references

Bibliography 

 J. M. A. Scholz, Biblisch-kritische Reise in Frankreich, der Schweiz, Italien, Palästine und im Archipel in den Jahren 1818, 1819, 1820, 1821: Nebst einer Geschichte des Textes des Neuen Testaments, p. 104 f.

Greek New Testament lectionaries
10th-century biblical manuscripts
Manuscripts of the Vatican Library